Jerry Moore may refer to:

 Jerry Moore (American football, born 1939), American football player and coach
 Jerry Moore (American football, born 1949), American football player
 Jerry Moore (baseball) (1855–1890), Major League Baseball player
 Jerry J. Moore (1927–2008), American real estate developer
 Jerry A. Moore Jr. (1918–2017), Baptist minister and politician in Washington, D.C.